Wright was a federal electoral district in Quebec, Canada, that was represented in the House of Commons of Canada from 1896 to 1948.

This riding was created in 1892 from parts of the County of Ottawa riding. The electoral district was abolished in 1947 when it was merged into Gatineau riding.

Geography

In 1892, it consisted of the city of Hull, the town of Aylmer, the township of Templeton, including the village of Pointe-à-Gatineau, the townships of Hull, Eardley, Masham, Wakefield, Lowe, Denholm, Aylwin, Hincks, Bowman, Bigelow, Blake, Northfield, Wright, Bouchette, Cameron, Wabasse, Bouthillier, Kensington, Maniwaki, Egan, Lytton, Sicotte, Aumond, Robertson, and all the unorganized territories west of the River du Lièvre to the southern boundary of the county of Montcalm.

In 1903, it was redefined to consist of:
 the townships of Aylwin, Aumond, Baskatong, Bouchette, Cameron, Denholm, Eardley, Egan, Hincks, Hull, Kensington, Low, Lytton, Maniwaki, Masham, Northfield, Sicotte, Templeton, Wakefield and Wright,
 the villages and other municipal subdivisions of those townships,
the city of Hull,
 the town of Aylmer, and
 all of the unorganized territory bounded on the north-east by the county of Montcalm and on the east by a line formed by the production northwards of the eastern boundary line of the township of Baskatong.

In 1915, it was redefined to exclude  Hull City, East and West Hull, Gatineau Point, East, West and North Templeton, and the municipality of South Hull, which were transferred to the new electoral district of Hull.

In 1924, it was redefined to consist of the part of the County of Hull not included in the electoral district of Hull, together with that part of the County of Labelle included in the township of Blake.

In 1933, it was redefined to consist of:
 the county of Gatineau; and
 that part of the county of Labelle included in the township of Blake.

Members of Parliament

This riding elected the following Members of Parliament:

Election results

By-election: On Mr. Devlin being appointed trade commissioner to Ireland, 15 March 1897

By-election: Mr. Laurier elected to sit for Quebec East, 20 January 1905

By-election: On Mr. Perras' death, 28 June 1936

See also 

 List of Canadian federal electoral districts
 Past Canadian electoral districts

External links
Riding history from the Library of Parliament

Former federal electoral districts of Quebec